Palliopodex verrucosus is a leaf-veined slug, an air-breathing land slug or terrestrial gastropod mollusc in the family Athoracophoridae.  It is endemic to New Zealand's subantarctic Auckland Islands.

References
 Powell A. W. B., New Zealand Mollusca, William Collins Publishers Ltd, Auckland, New Zealand 1979 
 

Athoracophoridae
Gastropods of New Zealand
Fauna of the Auckland Islands
Gastropods described in 1889